Giambattista Visconti, O.S.A. (died 11 May 1638) was a Roman Catholic prelate who served as Bishop of Teramo (1609–1638).

Biography
Giambattista Visconti was born in Milan, Italy and ordained a priest in the Order of Saint Augustine.
On 16 March 1609, he was appointed during the papacy of Pope Paul V as Bishop of Teramo.
On 29 March 1609, he was consecrated bishop by Giovanni Garzia Mellini, Bishop of Imola, with Ottavio Belmosto, Bishop Emeritus of Aleria, and Antonio d'Aquino, Bishop of Sarno serving as co-consecrators. 
He served as Bishop of Teramo, until his death on 11 May 1638.

While bishop, he was the principal co-consecrator of Giovanni Dominico Giaconi, Bishop of Guardialfiera (1617); and Giovanni Michele de Varolis, Bishop of Cefalonia e Zante (1625).

References

External links and additional sources
 (for Chronology of Bishops)
 (for Chronology of Bishops)

17th-century Italian Roman Catholic bishops
Bishops appointed by Pope Paul V
1638 deaths